Substitutionary atonement, also called vicarious atonement, is a central concept within Western Christian theology which asserts that Jesus died "for us", as propagated by the Western classic and objective paradigms of atonement in Christianity, which regard Jesus as dying as a substitute for others, "instead of" them.

Substitutionary atonement has been explicated in the "classic paradigm" of the Early Church Fathers, namely the ransom theory, as well as in Gustaf Aulen's demystified reformulation, the  Christus Victor theory; and in the "objective paradigm," which includes Anselm of Canterbury's satisfaction theory, the Reformed period's penal substitution theory, and the Governmental theory of atonement.

Definition
Substitutionary atonement, also called vicarious atonement, is the idea that Jesus died "for us". There is also a less technical use of the term "substitution" in discussion about atonement when it is used in "the sense that [Jesus, through his death,] did for us that which we can never do for ourselves".

The English word atonement originally meant "at-one-ment", i.e. being "at one", in harmony, with someone. According to Collins English Dictionary, it is used to describe the redemption through Jesus' death and resurrection, to reconcile the world to himself, and also of the state of a person having been reconciled to God.

The word "atonement" is often used in the Old Testament to translate the Hebrew words kipper and kippurim, which mean 'propitiation' or 'expiation'. In the Old Testament (Hebrew Bible or Tanakh), atonement was accomplished by the sacrifice of specified animals such as lambs to pay for one's sins.

A distinction has to be made between substitutionary atonement (Christ suffers for us), and penal substitution (Christ punished instead of us), which is a subset or particular type of substitutionary atonement. Care should be taken when one reads the language of substitution in, for example, patristic literature, not to assume any particular substitution model is being used but should, rather, check the context to see how the author was using the language.

Origins

Jewish scriptures
According to Pate, the Jewish scriptures describe three types of vicarious atonement: the Paschal Lamb although the Psechal Lamb was not a sin offering; "the sacrificial system as a whole", although these were for "mistakes", not intentional sins and with the Day of Atonement as the most essential element; and the idea of the suffering servant (Isaiah 42:1-9, 49:1-6, 50:4-11, 52:13-53:12). The Old Testament Deuterocanon added a fourth idea, namely the righteous martyr (2 Maccabees, 4 Maccabees, Wisdom 2-5).

These traditions of atonement offer only temporary forgiveness, and korbanot (offerings) could only be used as a means of atoning for the lightest type of sin, that is sins committed in ignorance that the thing was a sin. In addition, korbanot have no expiating effect unless the person making the offering sincerely repents his or her actions before making the offering, and makes restitution to any person who was harmed by the violation. Marcus Borg notes that animal sacrifice in Second Temple Judaism was not a "payment for sin," but had a basic meaning as "making something sacred by giving it as a gift to God," and included a shared meal with God. Sacrifices had numerous purposes, namely thanksgiving, petition, purification, and reconciliation. None of them were a "payment or substitution or satisfaction," and even "sacrifices of reconciliation were about restoring the relationship."

In  he refers  to himself, and the Gospel of Matthew also applies that chapter to him.

Make my blood their purification, and take my life in exchange for theirs” (4 Maccabees 6:28-29). Clearly there were ideas that existed in the Judaism of the time that helped make sense of the death of the righteous in terms of atonement."

Paul

 contains the kerygma of the early Christians: 

The meaning of this kerygma is a matter of debate, and open to multiple interpretations. Traditionally, this kerygma is interpreted as meaning that Jesus' death was an atonement or ransom for, or propitiation or expiation of, God's wrath against humanity because of their sins. With Jesus' death, humanity was freed from this wrath. In the classical Protestant understanding humans partake in this salvation by faith in Jesus Christ; this faith is a grace given by God, and people are justified by God through Jesus Christ and faith in Him.

More recent scholarship has raised several concerns regarding these interpretations. The traditional interpretation sees Paul's understanding of salvation as involving "an exposition of the individual's relation to God." According to Krister Stendahl, the main concern of Paul's writings on Jesus' role, and salvation by faith, is not the individual conscience of human sinners, and their doubts about being chosen by God or not, but the problem of the inclusion of Gentile (Greek) Torah observers into God's covenant. Paul draws on several interpretative frames to solve this problem, but most importantly, his own experience and understanding. 

The kerygma from 1:Cor.15:3-5 refers to two mythologies: the Greek myth of the noble dead, to which the Maccabean notion of martyrdom and dying for ones people is related; and the Jewish myth of the persecuted sage or righteous man, in particular the "story of the child of wisdom." The notion of 'dying for' refers to this martyrdom and persecution. 'Dying for our sins' refers to the problem of Gentile Torah-observers, who, despite their faithfulness, cannot fully observe commandments, including circumcision, and are therefore 'sinners', excluded from God's covenant.  In the Jerusalem ekklēsia, from which Paul received this creed, the phrase "died for our sins" probably was an apologetic rationale for the death of Jesus as being part of God's plan and purpose, as evidenced in the scriptures. For Paul, it gained a deeper significance, providing "a basis for the salvation of sinful Gentiles apart from the Torah." Jesus' death and resurrection solved this problem of the exclusion of the Gentiles from God's covenant, as indicated by Rom 3:21-26.

Substitutionary atonement theories

Theories of atonement
A number of metaphors and Old Testament terms and references have been used in the New Testament writings to understand the person and death of Jesus. Starting in the second century CE, various theories of atonement have been posited to explain the death of Jesus, and the metaphors applied by the New Testament to understand his death. Over the centuries, Christians have held different ideas about how Jesus saved people, and different views still exist within different Christian denominations.

According to C. Marvin Pate, "there are three aspects to Christ's atonement according to the early Church: vicarious atonement [substitutionary atonement], the escatological defeat of Satan [Christ the Victor], and the imitation of Christ [participation in Jesus' death and resurrection]." Pate further notes that these three aspects were intertwined in the earliest Christian writings, but that this intertwining was lost since the Patristic times. Due to the influence of Gustaf Aulèn's (1879-1978) Christus Victor, the various theories or paradigms of atonement which developed after the New Testamentical writings are often grouped as "classic paradigm," "objective paradigm," and the "subjective paradigm":

Substitutionary atonement has been explicated in the "classic paradigm" of the Early Church Fathers, namely the ransom theory, as well as in Gustaf Aulen's demystified reformulation, the  Christus Victor theory; and in the "objective paradigm," which includes Anselm of Canterbury's satisfaction theory, the Reformed period's penal substitution theory, and the Governmental theory of atonement.

Classic paradigm

According to Yeo, the 

Pate differentiates the "Christ the Victor"-theme from the "vicarious atonement"-theme, both of which can be found in early Christianity.

The ransom theory presents Jesus as dying to overcome (supernatural) powers of sin and evil. In this model, the Devil has ownership over humanity (because they have sinned) so Jesus dies in their place to free them.  The doctrine is that Jesus gave himself as a ransom sacrifice on behalf of the people.  This is known as the oldest of the theories of the atonement, and is, in some form, still, along with the doctrine of theosis, the Eastern Orthodox Church's main theory of the atonement.

Many of the Church Fathers, including Justin Martyr, Athanasius and Augustine incorporate the ransom theory of atonement into their writings. The specific interpretation as to what this suffering for sinners meant differed to some extent. It is widely held that the early Church Fathers, including Athanasius and Augustine, taught that through Christ's vicarious suffering in humanity's place, he overcame and liberated humanity from sin, death, and the Devil.<ref name="CathEnc">"Doctrine of the Atonement." Catholic Encyclopedia." http://www.newadvent.org/cathen/02055a.htm</ref>

Gustaf Aulén reinterpreted the ransom theory in his study Christus Victor (1931), calling it the Christus Victor doctrine, arguing that Christ's death was not a payment to the Devil (Satan), but defeated the powers of evil, particularly Satan, which had held humankind in their dominion. According to Pugh, "Ever since [Aulén's] time, we call these patristic ideas the Christus Victor way of seeing the cross."

Objective paradigm

While the idea of substitutionary atonement is present in nearly all atonement theories, some argue that the specific ideas of satisfaction and penal substitution are later developments in the Roman Catholic church and in Calvinism. Both Anselm's satisfaction theory and the penal satisfaction theory  hold that human beings cannot rightfully repay the debt (to God's honour [Anselm], or to God's justice [penal substitution]) which was incurred through their willful disobedience to God. Since only God can make the satisfaction necessary to repay it, rather than merely forgiving humanity, God sent the God-man, Jesus Christ, to fulfill both these conditions. Christ is a sacrifice by God on behalf of humanity, taking humanity's debt for sin upon himself, and propitiating God's wrath. The penal substitution theory has been rejected by liberal Christians as un-Biblical, and an offense to the love of God. According to Richard Rohr, "[t]hese theories are based on retributive justice rather than the restorative justice that the prophets and Jesus taught."

The Governmental theory, introduced by Hugo Grotius (17th century), states that Christ suffered for humanity so that God could forgive humans without punishing them while still maintaining divine justice. Jesus' death demonstrated God's hatred of sin, and thus God's law (his rule, his government) is upheld (people see that sin is serious and will lead to death), and God forgives people who recognise this and respond through repentance. The governmental theory rejects the notion of penal substitution, but is still substitutionary itself in that Christ, in his exemplary sufferings, substituted for believers and the punishment they would otherwise receive.

Other substitutionary models
There are a number of other substitutionary theories of the atonement besides the four described above. A few are listed below:
 John McLeod Campbell (The nature of the Atonement [1856]): 'Campbell rejects the idea of vicarious punishment [...And] Taking a hint from Jonathan Edwards, ...develops the idea that Christ, as representative and complete man, was able to offer a vicarious repentance to God for men.'
 Horace Bushnell (The Vicarious Sacrifice [1866]): Bushnell rejected penal substitution and, instead, speaks of Christ as 'my sacrifice, who opens all to me'. 'Beholding Him with all my sin upon Him', he says, 'I count Him my offering....'
 Vincent Taylor (The Cross of Christ [1956]): '...in St. Paul's teaching Christ's death is substitutionary in the sense that He did for us that which we can never do for ourselves, but not in the sense that He transfers our punishment to Himself...' (p. 31). While rejecting as pagan the notion that Jesus' death propitiates the Father (p. 91), he talks of Jesus' sacrifice as vicarious, representative and sacrificial (p. 90), and says that for Jesus 'sacrifice is a representative offering in which men can share, making it the vehicle or organ of their approach to God' (p. 21). Taylor called this theory the 'Sacrificial Theory' (p. 104).
 F. W. Camfield (‘The Idea of Substitution in the Doctrine of the Atonement’ in SJT'' I [1948] 282-293): in his 1948 paper, Camfield spells out 'a non-penal view of substitution'.

Belief in substitutionary atonement 
Eastern Christians do not incorporate substitutionary atonement in their doctrine of the cross and resurrection. The Western part of the Catholic Church incorporates it into Aquinas' satisfaction doctrine rooted in the idea of penance. Most Evangelical Protestants interpret it largely in terms of penal substitution.

See also 

 Acts of Reparation to Jesus Christ
 Supersessionism
Altruistic suicide

Notes

References

Sources
Printed sources

 
 
 

 

 
 

 

 

 
 

 
 

 
 
 

 

 

Web sources

External links 

  (Arminian/Methodist)
 Penal Substitution by Greg Bahnsen (Calvinist/Reformed)
 Nonviolent Atonement and the Victory of Christ Nonviolent Atonement by Brad Jersak (Orthodox/Anabaptist)
 The Concept of Atonement in 1 John
 The Concept of Atonement in Hellenistic Thought and 1 John
 The Concept of Atonement in Early Rabbinic Thought and the New Testament Writings
 Targum Isaiah 53 and the New Testament Concept of Atonement
 The Concept of Atonement in the Gospel of John
 Jesus' Death for Us: A Sacrifice

Atonement in Christianity
Christian terminology